The following is a list of episodes for the Mega Man Star Force anime series, known in Japan as . The anime is currently composed of two series: the original series and Tribe. The anime series began on October 7, 2006 in Japan, and an English adaptation premiered on Toonami Jetstream on July 23, 2007.

The original Japanese episodes are roughly 10 minutes long, so the English version combines two episodes together to fill a single 30-minute time-slot. (An exception was made with Japanese episode 25 which was accompanied by ten minutes of recycled footage from previous episodes.) The show has only ever aired once on television as a 2-hour faux-movie presentation—composed of heavily slimmed-down versions of Japanese episodes 1 through 16—on Cartoon Network. Currently, it is unknown if it will ever air regularly on television, so the English air dates below refer only to the online airings on Toonami Jetstream.



Mega Man Star Force (original series)

{| class="wikitable" width="98%" cellpadding="3"
|-
! width="25" | # !! Japanese title !! English title !! width="120" | Original air date !! width="120" | English air date
|-
| colspan="5" bgcolor="#CCCCFF"|
|-
| align="center" | 01
| 
| rowspan="2" align="center" | "Omega-Xis: The Fugitive"
| align="center" | 2006-10-07
| align="center" rowspan="2" | 2007-07-23
|-
| align="center" | 02
| 
| align="center" | 2006-10-14
|-
| align="center" | 03
| 
| rowspan="2" align="center" | "Electromagnetic Wave Change!"
| align="center" | 2006-10-21
| align="center" rowspan="2" | 2007-07-30
|-
| align="center" | 04
| 
| align="center" | 2006-10-28
|-
| align="center" | 05
| 
| rowspan="2" align="center" | "Trouble Takes Wing"
| align="center" | 2006-11-04
| align="center" rowspan="2" | 2007-08-06
|-
| align="center" | 06
| 
| align="center" | 2006-11-11
|-
| align="center" | 07
| 
| rowspan="2" align="center" | "Crowded Air Waves"
| align="center" | 2006-11-18
| align="center" rowspan="2" | 2007-08-20
|-
| align="center" | 08
| 
| align="center" | 2006-11-25
|-
| align="center" | 09
| 
| rowspan="2" align="center" | "Two New Visitors"
| align="center" | 2006-12-02
| align="center" rowspan="2" | 2007-08-27
|-
| align="center" | 10
| 
| align="center" | 2006-12-09
|-
| align="center" | 11
| 
| rowspan="2" align="center" | "The Song of Lyra Note"
| align="center" | 2006-12-16
| align="center" rowspan="2" | 2007-09-04
|-
| align="center" | 12
| 
| align="center" | 2006-12-23
|-
| align="center" | 13
| 
| rowspan="2" align="center" | "Science Friction"
| align="center" | 2007-01-06
| align="center" rowspan="2" | 2007-09-17
|-
| align="center" | 14
| 
| align="center" | 2007-01-13
|-
| align="center" | 15
| 
| rowspan="2" align="center" | "Laughter in EM Wave Space"
| align="center" | 2007-01-20
| align="center" rowspan="2" | 2007-10-01
|-
| align="center" | 16
| 
| align="center" | 2007-01-27
|-
| align="center" | 17
| 
| rowspan="2" align="center" | "From Double to Bubble"
| align="center" | 2007-02-03
| align="center" rowspan="2" |2007-10-15
|-
| align="center" | 18
| 
| align="center" | 2007-02-10
|-
| align="center" | 19
| 
| rowspan="2" align="center" | "Mega Man Express and Wolf Woods"
| align="center" | 2007-02-17
| align="center" rowspan="2" |2007-10-29
|-
| align="center" | 20
| 
| align="center" | 2007-02-24
|-
| align="center" | 21
| 
| rowspan="2" align="center" | "Wolf: Roar of Anger"
| align="center" | 2007-03-03
| align="center" rowspan="2" |2007-11-12
|-
| align="center" | 22
| 
| align="center" | 2007-03-10
|-
| align="center" | 23
| 
| rowspan="2" align="center" | "Collision Course"
| align="center" | 2007-03-17
| align="center" rowspan="2" |2007-11-26
|-
| align="center" | 24
| 
| align="center" | 2007-03-31
|-
| align="center" | 25
| 
| align="center" | "Biggest Fan or Biggest Foe?"
| align="center" | 2007-03-31
| align="center" | 2007-12-10
|-
| align="center" | 26
| 
| align="center" | N/A
| align="center" | 2007-04-07
| align="center" | -
|-
| align="center" | 27
| 
| align="center" | N/A
| align="center" | 2007-04-14
| align="center" | -
|-
| align="center" | 28
| 
| align="center" | N/A
| align="center" | 2007-04-21
| align="center" | -
|-
| align="center" | 29
| 
| align="center" | N/A
| align="center" | 2007-04-28
| align="center" | -
|-
| align="center" | 30
| 
| align="center" | N/A
| align="center" | 2007-05-05
| align="center" | -
|-
| align="center" | 31
| 
| align="center" | N/A
| align="center" | 2007-05-12
| align="center" | -
|-
| align="center" | 32
| 
| align="center" | N/A
| align="center" | 2007-05-19
| align="center" | -
|-
| align="center" | 33
| 
| align="center" | N/A
| align="center" | 2007-05-26
| align="center" | -
|-
| align="center" | 34
| 
| align="center" | N/A
| align="center" | 2007-06-02
| align="center" | -
|-
| align="center" | 35
| 
| align="center" | N/A
| align="center" | 2007-06-09
| align="center" | -
|-
| align="center" | 36
| 
| align="center" | N/A
| align="center" | 2007-06-16
| align="center" | -
|-
| align="center" | 37
| 
| align="center" | N/A
| align="center" | 2007-06-23
| align="center" | -
|-
| align="center" | 38
| 
| align="center" | N/A
| align="center" | 2007-06-30
| align="center" | -
|-
| align="center" | 39
| 
| align="center" | N/A
| align="center" | 2007-07-07
| align="center" | -
|-
| align="center" | 40
| 
| align="center" | N/A
| align="center" | 2007-07-14
| align="center" | -
|-
| align="center" | 41
| 
| align="center" | N/A
| align="center" | 2007-07-21
| align="center" | -
|-
| align="center" | 42
| 
| align="center" | N/A
| align="center" | 2007-07-28
| align="center" | -
|-
| align="center" | 43
| 
| align="center" | N/A
| align="center" | 2007-08-04
| align="center" | -
|-
| align="center" | 44
| 
| align="center" | N/A
| align="center" | 2007-08-11
| align="center" | -
|-
| align="center" | 45
| 
| align="center" | N/A
| align="center" | 2007-08-18
| align="center" | -
|-
| align="center" | 46
| 
| align="center" | N/A
| align="center" | 2007-08-25
| align="center" | -
|-
| align="center" | 47
| 
| align="center" | N/A
| align="center" | 2007-09-01
| align="center" | -
|-
| align="center" | 48
| 
| align="center" | N/A
| align="center" | 2007-09-08
| align="center" | -
|-
| align="center" | 49
| 
| align="center" | N/A
| align="center" | 2007-09-15
| align="center" | -
|-
| align="center" | 50
| 
| align="center" | N/A
| align="center" | 2007-09-22
| align="center" | -
|-
| align="center" | 51
| 
| align="center" | N/A
| align="center" | 2007-09-29
| align="center" | -
|-
| align="center" | 52
| 
| align="center" | N/A
| align="center" | 2007-10-06
| align="center" | -
|-
| align="center" | 53
| 
| align="center" | N/A
| align="center" | 2007-10-13
| align="center" | -
|-
| align="center" | 54
| 
| align="center" | N/A
| align="center" | 2007-10-20
| align="center" | -
|-
| align="center" | 55
| 
| align="center" | N/A
| align="center" | 2007-10-27
| align="center" | -
|}

Shooting Star Rockman (Tribe)

{| class="wikitable" width="98%" cellpadding="3"
|-
! width="25" | # !! Japanese title !! English title !! width="120" | Original air date !! width="120" | English air date
|-
| colspan="5" bgcolor="#CCCCFF"|
|-
| align="center" | 01
| 
| align="center" | N/A
| align="center" | 2007-11-03
| align="center" | -
|-
| align="center" | 02
| 
| align="center" | N/A
| align="center" | 2007-11-10
| align="center" | -
|-
| align="center" | 03
| 
| align="center" | N/A
| align="center" | 2007-11-17
| align="center" | -
|-
| align="center" | 04
| 
| align="center" | N/A
| align="center" | 2007-11-24
| align="center" | -
|-
| align="center" | 05
| 
| align="center" | N/A
| align="center" | 2007-12-01
| align="center" | -
|-
| align="center" | 06
| 
| align="center" | N/A
| align="center" | 2007-12-08
| align="center" | -
|-
| align="center" | 07
| 
| align="center" | N/A
| align="center" | 2007-12-15
| align="center" | -
|-
| align="center" | 08
| 
| align="center" | N/A
| align="center" | 2007-12-22
| align="center" | -
|-
| align="center" | 09
| 
| align="center" | N/A
| align="center" | 2008-01-05
| align="center" | -
|-
| align="center" | 10
| 
| align="center" | N/A
| align="center" | 2008-01-12
| align="center" | -
|-
| align="center" | 11
| 
| align="center" | N/A
| align="center" | 2008-01-19
| align="center" | -
|-
| align="center" | 12
| 
| align="center" | N/A
| align="center" | 2008-01-26
| align="center" | -
|-
| align="center" | 13
| 
| align="center" | N/A
| align="center" | 2008-02-02
| align="center" | -
|-
| align="center" | 14
| 
| align="center" | N/A
| align="center" | 2008-02-09
| align="center" | -
|-
| align="center" | 15
| 
| align="center" | N/A
| align="center" | 2008-02-16
| align="center" | -
|-
| align="center" | 16
| 
| align="center" | N/A
| align="center" | 2008-02-23
| align="center" | -
|-
| align="center" | 17
| 
| align="center" | N/A
| align="center" | 2008-03-01
| align="center" | -
|-
| align="center" | 18
| 
| align="center" | N/A
| align="center" | 2008-03-08
| align="center" | -
|-
| align="center" | 19
| 
| align="center" | N/A
| align="center" | 2008-03-15
| align="center" | -
|-
| align="center" | 20
| 
| align="center" | N/A
| align="center" | 2008-03-22
| align="center" | -
|-
| align="center" | 21
| 
| align="center" | N/A
| align="center" | 2008-03-29
| align="center" | -

|}

Notes

External links and References
 Capcom's Ryūsei no Rockman game series splash page 
 Shogakukan's Ryūsei no Rockman anime page 
 Shogakukan's Ryūsei no Rockman Tribe anime page 
 TV Tokyo's Ryūsei no Rockman anime page 
 TV Tokyo's Ryūsei no Rockman Tribe anime page 
 XEBEC's Ryūsei no Rockman anime page 
 XEBEC's Ryūsei no Rockman Tribe anime page 
 Toonami Jetstream

es:Ryusei no Rockman